Mount Royal Collegiate is located on the west side of Saskatoon, Saskatchewan, Canada in Mount Royal.  As part of the Saskatoon Public School system, it serves students from grades 9 through 12. It is also known as Mount Royal, Royal, or simply MRCI.

Currently its feeder schools are Caroline Robins Community School, Ernest Lindner School, Howard Coad School, Pleasant Hill Community School, Vincent Massey School, Wâhkôhtowin School and W. P. Bate Community School.

History
Mount Royal opened its doors in 1960, as one of two Saskatoon west side Public High Schools, the other being Bedford Road Collegiate which was inaugurated in 1923. Mount Royal was located at the corner of Avenue W and Rusholme Road, where it still stands today. With additions of various labs and classrooms, the school has grown to occupy the entire block on Avenue W from Rusholme Road to 29th Street. Classes are also held in the old Estey Elementary School on Whitney Avenue, where its now called the Royal West Campus. The school originally offered academic studies until 1967, when it opened to skills education such as a Carpentry and Home Economics class. 
Today, Mount Royal provides a mix of academic and practical programming. In addition, some specialized programs offered at Mount Royal include a complete Cosmetology program and the High School Carpentry Apprenticeship Program (HCAP). The school also provides courses in "English as an Additional Language" (EAL) for new Canadians, Life Skills Work Study (LSWS) programs and a comprehensive offering of vocational and academic programs which are suitable for learners who have diverse learning needs, styles and requirements.

Sports
The school fields athletic teams known as the Mustangs:

Royal West Campus
Royal West Campus holds classes at the former Estey elementary school which is located nearby at 441 Witney Avenue North.

Notable alumni
Shannon Tweed, actress and model
Perry Ganchar, hockey player
Michael Linklater, basketball player
Michael Eklund, actor

References

High schools in Saskatoon
Educational institutions established in 1960
1960 establishments in Saskatchewan